Valley City is a village in Pike County, Illinois, United States. The population was 14 at the 2020 census, making Valley City the smallest incorporated place in Illinois in terms of population. In late December 2015 and early January 2016 the village had flooded, leaving many roads underwater.

Geography
Valley City is located at  (39.705990, −90.653656).

Demographics

At the 2000 census there were 14 people, 4 households, and 3 families in the village. The racial makeup of the village was 100.00% White.
Of the 4 households 25.0% had children under the age of 18 living with them, 75.0% were married couples living together, and 25.0% were non-families. 25.0% of households were one person and 25.0% were one person aged 65 or older. The average household size was 3.50 and the average family size was 4.00.

The age distribution was 14.3% under the age of 18, 35.7% from 18 to 24, 21.4% from 25 to 44, 21.4% from 45 to 64, and 7.1% 65 or older. The median age was 32 years. For every 100 females, there were 75.0 males. For every 100 females age 18 and over, there were 71.4 males.

The median household income was $41,250 and the median family income  was $41,250. Males had a median income of $36,250 versus $0 for females. The per capita income for the village was $6,833. None of the population and none of the families were below the poverty line.

See also
 Griggsville Landing, Illinois
 Griggsville Landing Lime Kiln

References

Villages in Pike County, Illinois
Villages in Illinois